is a female Japanese manga creator best known for her manga Samurai Harem: Asu no Yoichi which has been serialized in Monthly Shōnen Champion since 2006. Minamoto was formerly assistant to Hekiru Hikawa.

Works 
  (2006, Akita Shoten); English translation: Samurai Harem: Asu no Yoichi (2009, Tokyopop)
  (2006)
  (2008, Akita Shoten)

References

External links 
Yū Minamoto's blog

Manga artists
1982 births
Living people